Opostega phaeosoma is a moth of the family Opostegidae. It was described by Edward Meyrick in 1928. It is known from Mazoe, Zimbabwe.

References

Opostegidae
Moths of Africa
Moths described in 1928